Floyd's Bluff is a hill in southern Sioux City, Iowa that is named for Sergeant Charles Floyd.

Floyd, who was the quartermaster for the Lewis and Clark Expedition's Corps of Discovery, was the only fatality during the expedition. The bluff was Floyd's original burial site in 1804, and is now the location of a National Historic Landmark in his honor. The Floyd Monument is located above the east bank of the Missouri River, just downstream from the mouth of the Floyd River. The bluff itself is part of the Loess Hills formation.

The Floyd's Bluff area was settled in 1848 by William Thompson, a recent veteran of the Mexican–American War. He established a trading post, and registered the name "Floyd's Bluff" as the name for his city, which never materialized. Instead, settlers preferred the area between the mouths of the Floyd and Big Sioux rivers where they successfully established Sioux City in the 1850s. Floyd's Bluff eventually was incorporated into Sioux City with the development of the suburb of Morningside in the 1870s.

See also
 Sergeant Floyd Monument

External links
 Lewis and Clark History
 George Catlin's 1832 painting of Floyd's Bluff
 Floyd's Bluff
 William Thompson and Floyd's Bluff

Landforms of Iowa
Sioux City, Iowa
Lewis and Clark Expedition
Landforms of Woodbury County, Iowa
Hills of the United States
Tourist attractions in Sioux City, Iowa